Cyperus aucheri is a species of sedge that is native to parts of northern Africa and the Middle East.

See also 
 List of Cyperus species

References 

aucheri
Plants described in 1844
Flora of Afghanistan
Flora of Algeria
Flora of Iran
Flora of Iraq
Flora of Sudan
Flora of Saudi Arabia
Flora of Pakistan
Flora of Niger
Flora of Oman
Taxa named by Hippolyte François Jaubert
Taxa named by Édouard Spach